"One Day in September" is a song written and performed by Australian musician, Mike Brady from 1980. It's a sports anthem associated with Australian rules football, and specifically refers to the AFL Grand Final – a game which was traditionally played on the last Saturday in September. It was renamed for the 2015 AFL Grand Final to "One Day in October" due to the Grand Final then-played on the first Saturday of October.

References

Australian rules football songs
1980 songs